This was the first edition of the men's tournament.

Gong Maoxin and Zhang Ze won the title after defeating Hsieh Cheng-peng and Christopher Rungkat 6–3, 2–6, [10–3] in the final.

Seeds

Draw

References
 Main Draw

Liuzhou International Challenger - Men's Doubles